This is a list of manufacturers of Woodworking hand tools, hand-held power tools and stationary machines

References

Tool manufacturers
Woodworking tools
Store brands